Buck Peak is a summit in the Diablo Range in San Benito County, California.

References

Mountains of San Benito County, California
Diablo Range